Abdul Karim Gizar (born 1962) is an Iraqi weightlifter. He competed in the men's bantamweight event at the 1980 Summer Olympics.

References

1962 births
Living people
Iraqi male weightlifters
Olympic weightlifters of Iraq
Weightlifters at the 1980 Summer Olympics
Place of birth missing (living people)
20th-century Iraqi people